Events from the year 1699 in art.

Events
 The Académie Royale de Peinture et de Sculpture holds the first of a series of salons at the Louvre Palace.

Paintings

 Alexis Simon Belle – Allegorical portrait of James Francis Edward Stuart and his sister Louisa Maria Teresa Stuart
 Alexandre-François Desportes – The artist as a hunter (approximate date)
 Willem Frederiksz van Royen – The Carrot
 The Kangxi Emperor of China at age 45 (silk painting)
 Monastery of Moisei, Romania (icons)

Births
 February 15 – Giovanni Maria Morlaiter, Italian Rococo sculptor (died 1781)
 February 17 – Georg Wenzeslaus von Knobelsdorff, Prussian painter and architect (died 1753)
 March 26 – Hubert-François Gravelot, French illustrator (died 1773)
 May 28 – Laurent Cars, French designer and engraver (died 1771)
 October – Giuseppe Grisoni, Italian painter (died 1769)
 November 2 – Jean-Baptiste-Siméon Chardin, French painter (died 1779)
 November 25 – Pierre Subleyras, French painter, active during the late-Baroque and early-Neoclassic period (died 1749)
 date unknown
 Giovanni Antonio Capello, Italian painter (died 1741)
 Giovanni Antonio Guardi, also known as Gianantonio Guardi, Italian painter, 1756 co-founder of the Venetian Academy (died 1760)
 Giuseppe Marchesi, Italian painter active mainly in Bologna (died 1771)
 Giuseppe Nogari, Venetian painter of the Rococo, where he painted mainly half-body portraits (died 1763)
 Alexis Peyrotte, French decorator painter (died 1769)
 Giovanni Agostino Ratti, Italian cabinet painter, engraver, and constructed scenography (died 1755)
 Ivan Vishnyakov, Russian painter  (died 1761)
 probable (born 1699/1707) – Stefano Pozzi, Italian painter, designer, draughtsman and decorator (died 1768)
 probable (born 1699/1710) – Hristofor Zhefarovich, Serbian and Bulgarian painter, engraver and writer (died 1753)

Deaths
 January 3 – Mattia Preti, Italian Baroque artist who worked in Italy and Malta (born 1613)
 May – Lucas Achtschellinck, Flemish landscape painter (born 1626)
 May 22 – Giovanni Battista Buonocore, Italian painter (born 1643)
 October 8 (bur.) – Mary Beale, English portrait painter (born 1633)
 date unknown
 Tommaso Misciroli, Italian painter from Faenza (born 1636)
 Pandolfo Reschi, Polish-born Italian painter of battle scenes and landscapes (born 1643)
 Pedro Roldán, Spanish sculptor (born 1624)
 possible – Joannes van der Brugghen, Flemish Baroque painter and engraver (born 1649)

 
Years of the 17th century in art
1690s in art